"I'm in Heaven" is a song written and produced by American songwriter and producer Jason Nevins under his pseudonym U.K.N.Y., featuring vocals from British singer Holly James. The hook of the song interpolates "Human Nature" by Michael Jackson. "I'm in Heaven" was released as a single on June 16, 2003, in the United States. The single debuted at its peak of number nine on the UK Singles Chart and also reached the top 40 in Australia and the Netherlands.

Track listings

US and Canadian maxi-CD single
 "I'm in Heaven" (radio version)
 "I'm in Heaven" (club mix)
 "I'm in Heaven" (dub)

UK CD single
 "I'm in Heaven" (radio edit) – 3:08
 "I'm in Heaven" (David Anthony remix) – 3:43
 "I'm in Heaven" (Motivo vocal remix) – 6:20
 "I'm in Heaven" (Three Drives vocal remix) – 6:31
 "I'm in Heaven" (video)

UK cassette single
 "I'm in Heaven" (radio edit) – 3:08
 "I'm in Heaven" (David Anthony remix) – 3:43

Australian CD single
 "I'm in Heaven" (radio edit)
 "I'm in Heaven" (club mix)
 "I'm in Heaven" (Motivo vocal remix)
 "I'm in Heaven" (Three Drives extended vocal remix)

Charts

Release history

References

2003 singles
2003 songs
Jason Nevins songs
Sony Music Australia singles
UK Independent Singles Chart number-one singles
Ultra Music singles